In Scandinavia, a seat farm (Danish: sædegård; Norwegian: setegård/setegard; Swedish: sätesgård or säteri; Finnish: säteriratsutila) was a farm where a nobleman had his permanent residence.  They were found in the Kingdom of Denmark, the Kingdom of Norway, the Kingdom of Sweden, and Finland, and enjoyed certain privileges.

Norway 

The term was originally used for any farm where a nobleman chose to reside. In 1639 the status of seat farm was restricted to farms that for at least the previous forty years had enjoyed this status. After 1660, when absolute monarchy was introduced in Norway, non-noble persons could also achieve this status for their farm of residence.

Seat farms had, especially, freedom from taxes and tithes. After 1800 the tax exemption was modified, and under the 1821 Nobility Law the exemption ended upon the death of the person owning the farm at the time of the law's enactment.

 Approximate number of seat farms in 1639: 100
 Approximate number of seat farms in 1821: 25

List of Seat farms in Norway

See also 

 Danish nobility
 Finnish nobility
 Norwegian nobility
 Swedish nobility

Literature 
 Hvidtfeldt, Johan (editor): Håndbog for danske lokalhistorikere 
 Vigerust, Tore H.: vigerust.net: Adelens setegårder, hovedgårder og jordegods i Norge til ca 1800 at vigerust.net 
 Nationalencyklopedin: säteri at ne.se 
 Norsk historisk leksikon: Setegård at lokalhistoriewiki.no 
 Store norske leksikon: setegård at snl.no 

Nobility
Scandinavian culture